Scott Township is one of eight townships in Vanderburgh County, Indiana, United States. As of the 2010 census, its population was 8,528 and it contained 3,343 housing units. In recent years, Scott Township has become one of the fastest-growing townships in the county.

Scott Township was organized in 1821, and named for Samuel Scott, an early settler.

Geography

Cities, towns, villages
 Darmstadt (vast majority)

Unincorporated towns, communities
 Daylight
 Earle
 Elliott
 Hillsdale
 Inglefield
 McCutchanville (part of it)
 Stacer

Adjacent townships
 Vanderburgh County
 Armstrong Township (west)
 Center Township (south)
 German Township (southwest)
 Gibson County
 Johnson Township (north)
 Warrick County
 Campbell Township (southeast)
 Greer Township (northeast)

Cemeteries
The township contains these two cemeteries: Blue Grass and Trinity Parish.

Major highways

School districts
 Evansville-Vanderburgh School Corporation

(Schools in which Scott Township students attend within the Evansville Vanderburgh School Corporation, all of which are actually located within the township):
Scott Elementary School (K–6)
North Junior High School (7–8)
North High School

Also, several students along the northern boundary of Vanderburgh County attend schools in the South Gibson School Corporation, none of which is actually in Scott Township or Vanderburgh County.

Political districts
 Indiana's 8th congressional district
 State House District 78
 State Senate District 50

References
 
 United States Census Bureau 2007 TIGER/Line Shapefiles
 IndianaMap

External links

Townships in Vanderburgh County, Indiana
Townships in Indiana